Zorlențu Mare is a commune in Caraș-Severin County, western Romania, with a population of 1,147 people. It is composed of two villages, Zorlencior (Felsőzorlenc) and Zorlențu Mare.

References

Communes in Caraș-Severin County
Localities in Romanian Banat